Purbayan Chatterjee (born in Kolkata on 12th September 1976) is an Indian sitar maestro who lives in Mumbai, India. He is noted for amalgamating traditional Indian classical music with contemporary world music genres.

Early life and career 
Purbayan Chatterjee learnt Sitar from his father Parthapratim Chatterjee. Purbayan’s music is inspired by the sound of Pt. Nikhil Banerjee. He has performed as a solo artist and as a part of the groups Shastriya Syndicate and Stringstruck. He is also a vocalist and has performed in duet with Shankar Mahadevan (Dwo - from the album Stringstruck).

He has worked with Shastriya Syndicate – the first Indian Classical Band – Indian Classical band with a contemporary touch, which has performed at the Roskilde Festival, Denmark, OzAsia Festival, Australia, Traumzeit Festival, Germany etc. The album "Lehar" released by Times Music in 2008 has remained a best-seller for a year and a half. Shankar Mahadevan has performed the title song "Dwo" in Purbayan’s super-hit fusion album, "Stringstruck" released by Times Music. The number has also been compiled in the album "Aman ki Asha", an Indo-Pak peace project released by Times Music and has also received the Palm IRAA Award for the Best World Music Album of the Year. He designed the "Dwo" which is a Doppelganger of the Indian Sitar. He has performed several times with tabla maestro Ustad Zakir Hussain.

Awards 
 Chatterjee was a recipient of the President of India Award for being the Best Instrumentalist of the country at the age of 15. He has also received the Aditya Vikram Birla Award for excellence and contributions to the field. He has also been honoured with the Rasoi Award by Rotary International in 1995
 Aditya Vikram Birla Award

Discography 
Horizon - by Peshkar Music Germany
Nirman - By Sense World Music UK
Samwad - By Sense World Music UK (duet with violinist Kala Ramnath) - Songlines World Music Magazine Top Of The World (Top ten)
Rasayana - By Sense World Music UK (duet with flutist Shashank) - Songlines Top Of The World
Aavishkar - By Sense World Music UK (duet with violinist Kala Ramnath) - Songlines Top Of The World
Taalash - By Sense World Music UK
Rising Stars Magical Fingers - by HMV
Singing Sitar - by Virgin Records India
Lehar - Times Music (Purbayan's group Shastriya syndicate - The First Indian Classical Band ) Top of the charts for 6 months (Planet M charts and rhythm house charts)
Purbayan - Times Music with Pt Anindo Chatterjee tabla
Stringstruck - Times Music - Awarded Best World Music Album at Iraa Palm Expo 2009 - featuring Shankar Mahadevan, Taufiq Qureshi, Rakesh Chaurasia, Atul Raninga
Sitarscape - EMI Virgin
Hemisphere - Times Music

The album Lehar released by Times Music in 2008 has remained the bestseller for a year and a half.

Shankar Mahadevan has performed the title song Dwo in Chatterjee's fusion album Stringstruck, released by Times Music. The number has also been compiled in the album Aman ki Asha, an Indo-Pak peace project released by Times Music and has also received the Palm IRAA Award for the Best World Music Album of the Year.

Performances 
Chatterjee has performed in the following venues:
Queen Elizabeth Hall, London
Sydney Opera House
Ted Baxter Hall, Cape Town
Konzerthaus, Berlin
Esplanade Theatres, Singapore
Adelaide Festival Centre
Theatre de la Ville, Paris
Salle Gaveau, Paris
Palais de Beaux Arts, Brussels
Royal Festival Hall, London

He has also performed in the following music festivals:
Pt Bhimsen Joshi National Festival of Music and Dance, Hyderabad, India.
Bath International Music Festival, UK
Brighton Festival, UK
WOMAD, UK
Fishguard International Music Festival, UK
International Music Symposium, Germany
Millennium Festival WDR Koln, Germany
The Port Fairy Folk Festival, Australia
The North Sea Jazz Festival, Cape Town
World Music Festival, Chicago
Alchemy Festival, UK

References

Sitar players
1976 births
Living people
Musicians from Kolkata
Virgin Records artists
EMI Classics and Virgin Classics artists
World music musicians
Indian male musicians